The Ministry of Trade, Industry and Cooperatives  (MTIC) is a cabinet level ministry of the government of Uganda. The mission of the ministry is to "develop and promote a competitive and export-driven private sector through the acceleration of industrial development", with the ultimate objective being the growth of the Ugandan economy. The ministry is headed by Minister Francis Mwebesa, who was appointed by the president.

Location
The headquarters of MTIC are located in Farmers House, at Plot 6-8 Parliamentary Avenue, on Nakasero Hill, in the Central Division of Kampala, Uganda's capital and largest city. The coordinates of MTIC headquarters are 00°18'48.0"N, 32°35'07.0"E (Latitude:0.313327; Longitude:32.585275).

Overview
The ministry is headed by a cabinet level minister, assisted by three ministers of state. These four are appointed by the president of Uganda:
 Minister of Trade, Industry and Cooperatives - Hon. Mwebesa Francis 
 State Minister for Trade Hon. Ntabazi Harriet
 State Minister for Cooperatives Frederick Ngobi Gume
 State Minister for Industry - Hon. Bahati David

Departments and units
The ministry is organised into seven administrative departments and seven operational units.

The administrative departments are:
 Finance and Administration
 External Trade
 Internal Trade
 Cooperative Development
 Industry and Technology
 Processing and Marketing
 Business Development and Quality Analysis

The operational units are:
 Policy and Planning
 Resource Center and ICT
 Procurement and Disposal
 Internal Audit
 Human Resources
 Accounts
 Legal Services

Affiliated  agencies
MTIC collaborates with and overseas the operations of the following semi-autonomous institutions:

 Uganda National Bureau of Standards
 Management Training and Advisory Centre
 Uganda Export Promotion Board
 Uganda Industrial Research Institute
 Uganda Commodity Exchange
 Uganda Development Corporation
 Uganda Warehouse Receipt Authority
 Uganda Cleaner Production
 Textile Development Agency

List of ministers
 Francis Mwebesa (8 June 2021 - present)
 Amelia Kyambadde (27 May 2011 - 8 June 2021)
 Kahinda Otafiire (16 February 2009 - 27 May 2011)
 Janat Mukwaya (1 June 2006 - 16 February 2009)
 Daudi Migereko (12 January 2005 - 1 June 2006)
 Edward Rugumayo (2000 - 12 January 2005)

See also
 Cabinet of Uganda
 Government of Uganda

References

External links
Website of Uganda Ministry of Trade, Industry and Cooperatives

Trade, Industry and Cooperatives
Uganda
Uganda
Economy of Uganda
Foreign trade of Uganda